In classical mechanics, Poinsot's construction (after Louis Poinsot) is a geometrical method for visualizing the torque-free motion of a rotating rigid body, that is, the motion of a rigid body on which no external forces are acting. This motion has four constants: the kinetic energy of the body and the three components of the angular momentum, expressed with respect to an inertial laboratory frame. The angular velocity vector  of the rigid rotor is not constant, but satisfies Euler's equations.  Without explicitly solving these equations, Louis Poinsot was able to visualize the motion of the endpoint of the angular velocity vector.  To this end he used the conservation of kinetic energy and angular momentum as constraints on the motion of the angular velocity vector . If the rigid rotor is symmetric (has two equal moments of inertia), the vector  describes a cone (and its endpoint a circle). This is the torque-free precession of the rotation axis of the rotor.

Angular kinetic energy constraint

The law of conservation of energy implies that in the absence of energy dissipation or applied torques, the angular kinetic energy  is conserved, so .

The angular kinetic energy may be expressed in terms of the moment of inertia tensor  and the angular velocity vector 

Thus, the conservation of kinetic energy imposes a constraint on the three-dimensional angular velocity vector ; in the principal axis frame, it must lie on the ellipsoid defined by the above equation, called the inertia ellipsoid.

The path traced out on this ellipsoid by the angular velocity vector  is called the polhode (coined by Poinsot from Greek roots for "pole path") and is generally circular or taco-shaped.

Angular momentum constraint

The law of conservation of angular momentum states that in the absence of applied torques, the angular momentum vector  is conserved in an inertial reference frame, so .

The angular momentum vector  can be expressed
in terms of the moment of inertia tensor  and the angular velocity vector 

which leads to the equation

has a constant component in the direction of the angular momentum vector . This imposes a second constraint on the vector ; in absolute space, it must lie on the invariable plane defined by its dot product with the conserved vector . The path traced out by the angular velocity vector  on the invariable plane is called the herpolhode (coined from Greek roots for "serpentine pole path").

The herpolhode is generally an open curve, which means that the rotation does not perfectly repeat, but the polhode is a closed curve (see below).

Tangency condition and construction

These two constraints operate in different reference frames; the ellipsoidal constraint holds in the (rotating) principal axis frame, whereas the invariable plane constant operates in absolute space.  To relate these constraints, we note that the gradient vector of the kinetic energy with respect to angular velocity vector  equals the angular momentum vector 

Since their normal vectors point in the same direction, these two surfaces will intersect tangentially.

Taken together, these results show that, in an absolute reference frame, the instantaneous angular velocity vector  is the point of intersection between a fixed invariable plane and a kinetic-energy ellipsoid that is tangent to it and rolls around on it without slipping.  This is Poinsot's construction.

Derivation of the polhodes in the body frame

In the principal axis frame (which is rotating in absolute space), the angular momentum vector is not conserved even in the absence of applied torques, but varies as described by Euler's equations. However, in the absence of applied torques, the magnitude of the angular momentum and the kinetic energy are both conserved

where the are the components of the angular momentum vector along the principal axes, and the are the principal moments of inertia.

These conservation laws are equivalent to two constraints to the three-dimensional angular momentum vector . The kinetic energy constrains  to lie on an ellipsoid, whereas the angular momentum constraint constrains  to lie on a sphere. This shows that , and the polhode, stay on a closed loop, in the object's moving frame of reference.

The orientation of the body in space thus has two degrees of freedom. Secondly, with the vector in the body frame that goes through this point fixed, the body can have any amount of rotation around that vector. So in principle, the body's orientation is some point on a toroidal 2-manifold inside the 3-manifold of all orientations. In general, the object will follow a non-periodic path on this torus, but it may follow a periodic path.

In general a torus is almost determined by three parameters: the ratios of the second and third moments of inertia to the highest of the three moments of inertia, and the ratio  relating the angular momentum to the energy times the highest moment of inertia. But for any such a set of parameters there are two tori, because there are two "tacos" (corresponding to two polhodes). A set of 180° rotations carries any orientation of one torus into an orientation of the other with the opposite point aligned with the angular momentum vector. If the angular momentum is exactly aligned with a principal axes, the torus degenerates into a single loop. If exactly two moments of inertia are equal (a so-called symmetric body), then in addition to tori there will be an infinite number of loops, and if all three moments of inertia are equal, there will be loops but no tori. If the three moments of inertia are all different and  but the intermediate axis is not aligned with the angular momentum, then the orientation will be some point on a topological open annulus.

Because of all this, when the angular velocity vector (or the angular momentum vector) is not close to the axis of highest or lowest inertia, the body "tumbles". Most moons rotate more or less around their axis of greatest inertia (due to viscous effects), but
Hyperion (a moon of Saturn), two moons of Pluto and many other small bodies of the Solar System have tumbling rotations.

If the body is set spinning on its intermediate principal axis, then the intersection of the ellipsoid and the sphere is like two loops that cross at two points, lined up with that axis. If the alignment with the intermediate axis is not perfect then  will eventually move off this point along one of the four tracks that depart from this point, and head to the opposite point. This corresponds to  moving to its antipode on the Poinsot ellipsoid. See video at right and Tennis racket theorem.

This construction differs from Poinsot's construction because it considers
the angular momentum vector  rather than the angular velocity vector .  It appears to have been developed by Jacques Philippe Marie Binet.

Special case
In the general case of rotation of an unsymmetric body, which has different values of the moment of inertia about the three principal axes, the rotational motion can be quite complex unless the body is rotating around a principal axis. As described in the tennis racket theorem, rotation of an object around its first or third principal axis is stable, while rotation around its second principal axis (or intermediate axis) is not. The motion is simplified in the case of an axisymmetric body, in which the moment of inertia is the same about two of the principal axes. These cases include rotation of a prolate spheroid (the shape of an American football), or rotation of an oblate spheroid (the shape of a flattened sphere). In this case, the angular velocity describes a cone, and the polhode is a circle.  This analysis is applicable, for example, to the axial precession of the rotation of a planet (the case of an oblate spheroid.)

Applications

One of the applications of Poinsot's construction is in visualizing the rotation of a spacecraft in orbit.

See also

 Polhode
 Precession
 Principal axes
 Rigid body dynamics
 Moment of inertia
 Tait–Bryan rotations
 Euler angles
 MacCullagh ellipsoid
 Rattleback

References

Sources

 Poinsot (1834) Theorie Nouvelle de la Rotation des Corps, Bachelier, Paris.
 Landau LD and Lifshitz EM (1976) Mechanics, 3rd. ed., Pergamon Press.
 Goldstein H. (1980) Classical Mechanics, 2nd. ed., Addison-Wesley. 
 Symon KR. (1971) Mechanics, 3rd. ed., Addison-Wesley.

External links
 Poinsot construction in stereo 3D simulation - online and free.

Rigid bodies